The HTC Evo 4G (trademarked in capitals as EVO 4G, also marketed as HTC EVO WiMAX ISW11HT in Japan) is a smartphone developed by HTC Corporation and marketed as Sprint's flagship Android smartphone, running on its WiMAX network. The smartphone was launched on June 4, 2010. It was the first 4G enabled smartphone released in the United States.

History 
During development, the device was known as the HTC "Supersonic", which was leaked through the Internet and was known as a variant of the HTC HD2 running Android.

The EVO was released on June 4, 2010 in the United States through Sprint. The device became the top-selling launch day phone on Sprint, surpassing the Palm Pre, Samsung Instinct and Motorola Razr V3.

Features 
The HTC EVO features hardware very similar to the HTC HD2, a smartphone running Windows Mobile. The device is sometimes referenced as the Android version of the HTC HD2 although a variety of features are only available on the EVO 4G (video calling for example).

Screen and input 
The EVO proved a trendsetter among Android phones. Unlike many other smartphones at the time of its release, the EVO has a large 4.3-inches (480x800) TFT LCD capacitive touch screen display with a pixel density of 217 pixels per inch (ppi). Larger sizes are commonplace now, but in mid-2010, this was quite innovative. The display is designed to be used with a bare finger or multiple fingers at one time for multi-touch sensing. Most gloves and styli prevent the necessary electric conductivity needed for use on the capacitive display.

The EVO has a balanced hardware-software user interface, featuring seven hardware/touch sensitive buttons, four of which are on the front of the device. Input and interaction with the device is balanced between the hardware and software user interface and in most situations require users to use hardware/touch sensitive buttons often throughout Android OS. Like most Gingerbread era Android devices, the EVO features four main touch-sensitive buttons on the front — Home, Menu, Back, and Search. The Home button returns to the Sense Home screen. The Menu button shows menu options in various applications although it can also be used for other purposes, the Back button is used to return to the prior page or screen displayed, and the Search button mainly allows searching through the phone but can be used for other purposes in various applications. Unlike iPhones, the device does not feature a hardware ringer switch. The volume adjustment control is located on the right spine. A multifunction sleep/wake button is located on the top of the device, which serves as the unit's power and sleep button and also controls phone calls. The touchscreen furnishes the remainder of the user interface.

The device responds to four sensors. A proximity sensor deactivates the display and touchscreen when the device is brought near the face during a call. This is done to save battery power and to prevent inadvertent inputs via users' faces and ears. An ambient light sensor adjusts the display brightness, which in turn saves battery power. A 3-axis accelerometer senses the orientation of the phone and changes the screen accordingly, allowing users to easily switch between page orientation modes. A geomagnetism sensor provides orientation with respect to Earth's magnetic field. The proximity sensor and the accelerometer can also be used to control and/or interact with third party apps, notably games. The device also contains a temperature sensor used for monitoring the temperature of the battery.

The device also features a GPS chip, allowing applications (with user permission) to report device location allowing for location-based services and can also be useful to turn-by-turn navigation apps.

Processor and memory 
The EVO is powered by the Qualcomm QSD8650 chipset that contains a Snapdragon Scorpion microprocessor clocked at 1 GHz and an embedded Adreno 200 graphics chip capable of up to 22 million triangles per second.

It features 512 MB of eDRAM, which allows for a smoother experience with Android OS, applications, and the HTC Sense user interface. The device also features 1 GB of built-in ROM that is mainly used for the system software.

Cameras 
The EVO features a rear-facing backside illumination 8-megapixel camera capable of recording videos in 720p at 30 frames per second and dual photoflash, which helps to illuminate objects in low-light conditions. In addition, the EVO has a 1.3-megapixel camera on front of the device designed for use with video calling and for taking portrait images, although it can also be used in other applications. The front facing camera does not work on any versions of Android higher than 2.3.7 Gingerbread.

Storage 
Like many other Android mobile devices, the HTC EVO 4G features a microSD slot in addition to the built-in ROM that allows for user-expandable storage. The device supports microSD cards of sizes up to 32 GB. With Android version 2.2+ (Froyo) available as an over-the-air upgrade, the OS supports applications that permit themselves to be installed on the SD card.

The device comes pre-installed with an 8 GB microSDHC card of Class 2 or 4.

Audio and output
The rear of the EVO sports a speaker that is used for most applications like music, applications, and such as the main speaker. A loudspeaker that serves as an earpiece is located above the screen. The microphone is featured on the bottom of the phone and is used for phone calls and voice-commands, although it can also be used in many other third-party applications. The unit has an HDMI-out (type D, micro connector) port, which allows sending content to an HD television set. The Sprint Mobile Hotspot application allows sharing the device's mobile broadband with up to eight devices.

Smartphone connectivity 
The EVO features a CDMA cellular radio that supports 3G EVDO, Revisions 0, A, and the yet-undeployed B allowing faster download and upload speeds, greater power efficiency; and WiMAX, a protocol known as 802.16e, featuring speeds of up to 10 Mbit/s on the downlink and 1.5 Mbit/s on the uplink. The device is marketed as a 4G phone, WiMAX is considered to be a 4G technology based on 4G standards recently set by ITU-R. 4G for this device does not work on Android versions above 2.3.7 Gingerbread.

Battery and power 
The device comes pre-installed with a 1500 mAh Li-ion rechargeable battery that is designed to be user-replaceable. The battery is interchangeable with batteries from the HTC Incredible, HTC Touch Pro 2, HTC Arrive, and HTC Hero (CDMA). Stand by for the pre installed battery is 146 h. and talk time is 5 hr and 12 min.

Software
The device sports the HTC Sense user interface that runs on top of the Android operating system and presents information through the Android desktop widgets and application, and includes launchers, app drawer, and lock screen replacements. Sense also brings a modified browser and home screen as well. The device first came with Android OS 2.1 "Eclair" although Android OS 2.2 "Froyo" has since been rolled out through OTA (Over-The-Air) making it the third device to officially run "Froyo" and the first to be officially rolled out by a US network. Exactly a year after the phone's official release, the EVO received an update to Android 2.3.3 (Gingerbread). The software could be manually installed by searching for a software update, and began being pushed to HTC EVOs across Sprint on June 6, 2011. Improvements aside from the upgraded Android OS include a fix for battery issues, increases battery life, includes the ability to sync multiple Gmail accounts, and a few user interface tweaks. A second update was pushed by Sprint on June 20, 2011, fixing magnetometer (compass) issues, Netflix streaming, voicemail notifications, and hearing aid compatibility. The Phone (like many of the phones from this year) did NOT officially get the Android Ice Cream Sandwich Update. Only getting the 2010 versions of Android.

The EVO has also seen support from the developer community with Android versions including Ice Cream Sandwich 4.0, Jelly Bean 4.1 - 4.3, and finally KitKat 4.4, some of which are available with HTC Sense while other available versions are based on stock Android. As of the end of 2016, there is very little, if any, support from the community due to the age of the device and the fact that more recent versions of Android (5.0+) on this device may not run.

Interface 
In HTC Sense, the interface is based around home screen panels which in total are seven panels that allows user-customization. By default, the center home screen panel features a digital clock located on the top of the screen and weather animations of the current weather in the device's location, the remaining space in the bottom can be customized to user preferences. The launcher, located at the bottom of the screen, displays icons to open the App Drawer, Phone application, and the ability to add widgets on the Android desktop, and is shown throughout all seven home screen panels. Users can switch from one panel to another by sliding left or right. A small bar that sits on top of the launcher represents the current panel the device is viewing. Pinching the home screen (or pressing the home button if the user is on the center panel) brings up Leap screen, showing thumbnail views of all the home screen panels and allowing users to "leap" to another home screen panel easily. Unlike other custom user interfaces for the Android OS like Samsung's TouchWiz UI, HTC Sense does not allow disabling or removing a panel.

Most of the input on the device is given through the touchscreen, which understands complex gestures using multi-touch. Android's interaction techniques enable moving up or down by a touch-drag motion of the finger. However the buttons on the front of the device will also require frequent use throughout various applications in Android OS as the buttons play an important part in the user interface.

Criticism

30 frames per second cap 
Some users have experienced noticeable graphics lag and/or slowness while using the phone. Various reports throughout the Internet indicated that the device may have a 30 frames per second cap. An HTC representative announced that it was a hardware cap, not subject to software updates. Despite the repeated claims regarding the supposed hardware cap, HTC released an update on September 22, 2010 that, among other things, removed the 30 FPS cap.

Screen 
There have been many problems with the screen. Some of the first customers complained of screen separation; HTC acknowledged the problem and was able to limit the number of affected units. Another problem with the screen is a bright spot in the lower area of the screen. This is commonly referred to as the 'B-spot' or 'B-spot problem' due to the bright spot sitting at the location of the B key on the default on-screen QWERTY keyboard. The bright spot is only noticeable when the screen's brightness is turned up and the content is light/white. This 'B-spot' may also become visible when the display is set to automatic brightness.

Device clock reference 
The device clock is 15 seconds faster than Coordinated Universal Time (UTC), either with Android 2.1, 2.2 or 2.3; a manual clock setting does not override seconds, and root authority would be needed to overcome issue using Network Time Protocol (ntp) software. The 15-second offset hints the number of leap seconds introduced since GPS inception in 1980 rather than an epoch issue and was reported as an Android bug on December 16, 2009. Certain phones running Android including Samsung EPIC do not exhibit the issue, possibly because firmware fetches UTC value rather than GPS from Network time, or subtracts leap second offset. Sprint, HTC, OHA, Google and goodandevo.net were informed of the aforesaid issue earlier than October 2010, reported as Android bug 5485. HTC update 3.70.651.1 released on December 15, 2010 still did not overcome the issue, and neither did build 4.22.651.2 (Android 2.3.3) released on June 3, 2011. Finally, on January 19, 2012, HTC software update 4.67.651.3 overcame the issue, just a week before the end of life for the EVO was announced.

Battery life 
Users have complained that the battery life for the Evo is inadequate and incapable of lasting one day of normal use. This has spawned the creation of pages dedicated to explaining how to optimize the battery life, and even an aftermarket extra large battery that enlarges the unit. In addition, there is a software error that causes a severely depleted battery to become unable to be charged in the phone. The OTA upgrade to Android 2.3.3 fixes this issue along with improving device battery life on the whole.

Design 
The EVO's design is derived from its Windows Mobile-based brother, the HTC HD2, which also has a  multi-touch capacitive touchscreen, nearly the same slim profile, and the same placements of most general components and buttons. Although similar, the EVO has features that distinguish it from the HTC HD2 including the front-facing camera, the circular-shaped rear camera, an integrated 
Kickstand, and touch-sensitive buttons instead of hardware buttons. Another feature is Android-specific buttons. The device has nearly the same dimensions, namely high wide deep.

Warranty 
The phone comes with a one-year warranty, which does not cover scratches, cracks, smudge marks, liquid damage, and other forms of physical damage. Sending phones for repair is typically handled by the phone service provider, rather than through HTC.

See also 
 Android (operating system)
 HTC Evo Shift 4G
 HTC Evo 3D
 HTC Evo Design 4G
 HTC Evo 4G LTE

References

External links 
 HTC EVO 4G PC World Review
 HTC EVO 4G Specs
  HTC EVO 4G LTE Specs

Mobile phones introduced in 2010
Discontinued smartphones
EVO
Android (operating system) devices
Mobile phones with user-replaceable battery